Rutkowski Glacier is a glacier which drains the northern part of the Dominion Range icecap eastward of Mount Mills. It descends northeastward into Meyer Desert where it terminates without reaching Beardmore Glacier. Named by Advisory Committee on Antarctic Names (US-ACAN) for Richard L. Rutkowski, United States Antarctic Research Program (USARP) meteorologist at the South Pole Station, 1962.
 

Glaciers of Dufek Coast